Editum editoides is a moth of the family Erebidae first described by Michael Fibiger in 2010. It is known from Vietnam.

The wingspan is about 12 mm. The head, patagia, anterior part of the tegulae, prothorax, basal part of the costa, costal part of the medial area, subterminal and terminal areas, including the fringes are blackish brown. The costal medial area is triangular. The forewing ground colour is light brown. The crosslines are untraceable, except the terminal line, which is well marked by black interneural dots. The hindwing is grey with a discal spot. The underside of the forewing is brown, while the underside of the hindwing is grey with a discal spot.

References

Micronoctuini
Moths described in 2010